Teddy Mark Šime Lučić (born 15 April 1973) is a Swedish former footballer and manager. He played as a centre-back. Lučić made his debut for Sweden in 1995, and represented his country at three FIFA World Cups (1994, 2002, and 2006) and two UEFA European Championships (2000 and 2004), earning a total of 86 caps.

Early life
Lučić was born on 15 April 1973 in Biskopsgården, Gothenburg to Croatian father, Krešimir, and Finnish mother, Annis. His father Krešimir was also a football player. In 1966, Krešimir moved to Sweden where he played football. In 1971, his father was offered to play for Halmstads BK but declined because he thought he was too old, at age 27. The Lučić family decided to live in Sweden but visited Croatia and Finland often.

As a boy, Lučić attended the Bjurslätt School in Hisingen, which is only 500 meters from where BK Häcken have their exercise equipment. Due to his parents' heritage, Lučić had Yugoslavian passport rather than a Swedish one, which prevented him from playing in the Swedish Junior Team.

Club career

Early career
He began playing for Lundby IF as an 18-year-old for whom he played 44 times in the Swedish league and scored 10 goals from fullback. He moved to Västra Frölunda IF in 1993 for a two-year spell in which he played 68 matches. In 1996, he moved on to IFK Göteborg, landing the Swedish championship in his first season.

Bologna
Lučić went abroad to Italy upon leaving IFK Göteborg in 1998. However, he found his opportunities limited at his new club and consequently made just nine league appearances in the Serie A in a two-year spell.

AIK
Lučić returned to Sweden in 2000, signing for AIK Fotboll. He made 58 appearances and scored four times. He left the club in 2003 to move to Germany.

Loan to Leeds United
Lučić's period at AIK Fotboll was broken up by a loan spell at English club Leeds United, starting in 2002. During his time in England, he made a total of 17 league appearances and scored one goal, in a 3–2 defeat at Chelsea in January 2003. His loan spell ended in 2003 after Leeds decided not to sign him on a permanent deal. AIK had offered Lučić to a number of clubs.

Bayer Leverkusen
Lučić signed for Bayer Leverkusen directly from Leeds in May 2003. He failed to get a major impact for the starting 11 in Bundesliga,  and only played 11 times for the club, before he left for Sweden in December 2004.

Return to Sweden
Lučić went back to Sweden for a second time to sign for BK Häcken, where he made 70 appearances and scored 8 goals. In 2008, Lučić moved again to the ninth club of his career, IF Elfsborg where he was a regular in the starting eleven until the end of his career. After IF Elfsborgs last game of the season, on 7 November 2010, Lucic officially ended his career as a player.

International career
Lučić played 86 times for the Swedish national team, mostly as a full back. He was handed his debut against Brazil in June 1995.

Since 2004, he played as centre back. Lučić played in Euro 2004, and the 2002 and 2006 World Cups (in 1994 he was unused substitute having been called up to replace Jan Eriksson). Against Germany, in what turned out to be Sweden's final 2006 World Cup match, he was given two yellow cards by Brazilian referee Carlos Eugênio Simon, and sent off in the 35th minute.

Personal life
Due to his multinational background, Lučić had the option to play for two other countries—his mother is Finnish and his father Croatian. He is fluent in Croatian and also speaks some Finnish. He has a summer cottage in Lappeenranta, Finland, and is a fan of Lappeenranta-based first division football team Rakuunat and ice hockey team SaiPa.

Career statistics

Club

International 
Appearances and goals by national team and year

Honours
IFK Göteborg
Allsvenskan: 1996
Sweden
FIFA World Cup third place: 1994

References

External links 
 Teddy Lučić at Leverkusen who's who
 
 

1973 births
Living people
Footballers from Gothenburg
Swedish people of Croatian descent
Swedish people of Finnish descent
Swedish footballers
Association football defenders
Sweden international footballers
Sweden under-21 international footballers
1994 FIFA World Cup players
UEFA Euro 2000 players
2002 FIFA World Cup players
UEFA Euro 2004 players
2006 FIFA World Cup players
Allsvenskan players
Superettan players
Lundby IF players
Ettan Fotboll players
Division 3 (Swedish football) players
Västra Frölunda IF players
IFK Göteborg players
Swedish expatriate footballers
Expatriate footballers in Italy
Serie A players
Bologna F.C. 1909 players
Swedish expatriate sportspeople in Italy
AIK Fotboll players
Expatriate footballers in England
Premier League players
Leeds United F.C. players
Swedish expatriate sportspeople in England
Expatriate footballers in Germany
Bundesliga players
Bayer 04 Leverkusen players
Swedish expatriate sportspeople in Germany
BK Häcken players
IF Elfsborg players